(), or  , is the southeastern quarter of the four quarters of Lower Austria (the northeast state of the 9 states in Austria). The Vienna Woods forms the natural border to the west, and hence the alternate name as "Quarter below the ".

Since the formation of the political districts in 1868, the quarters in Lower Austria no longer have a legal basis and are purely landscape names. Today the industrial Quarter is represented by the districts Vienna Woods (Wienerwald) and the Vienna Alps (Wiener-Alpen).

Districts
The  is made up of the following districts:

Landscape
In the stone field, on brown earth soils, are vast pine forests which had been created under Empress Maria Theresa, to prevent the desertification of the arid landscape.

Climate

Economy
The name  stems from the industrial area of early industrialisation, which was already the focus of the economy in the Vienna Woods region in 1783. Because of its favorable location factors, such as proximity to raw material collected from wood, iron and coal, and hydroelectric energy sources, and wood, plus the sales-market of the nearby city of Vienna, industries increased here.

The industrial district was severely affected by the two world wars. Thus, the Soviets confiscated belongings of the USIA holdings company and uninstalled some machinery and entire plants completely, in order to reassemble them in the Soviet Union. There are, however, still a number of industries located here. Especially along the Thermenlinie (thermal fault line), after 1955, many small and large industrial centers were built as the industrial center south of Lower Eco Plus. Establishments in the city of Vienna were among the first that moved into this area. , although the smallest district in the state, has the highest tax base in Austria.

References

External links
 
  
Official website Vienna woods
Official website vienna alps

Geography of Lower Austria